The 2021–22 Union Dutchmen ice hockey season was the 81st season of play for the program and the 30th season in the ECAC Hockey conference. The Dutchmen represented Union College and played their home games at Achilles Center, and were coached by Rick Bennett, in his 10th season.

Season
After losing the entirety of their previous season to the COVID-19 pandemic, Union got a slow start to their season. Neither the offense nor the defense were effective during the first month of the season but, once November rolled around, the Dutchmen began to show some promise. Inconsistent play had the team floating in the middle of the ECAC Hockey standings and by the winter break the team well out of the running for the NCAA tournament.

On January 19, the Union administration received an allegation regarding the conduct of head coach Rick Bennett. He was placed on paid administrative leave the following day when an investigation began and assistant coach John Ronan took over day-to-day responsibilities. Nine days later, after the investigation confirmed the allegation about 'coaching style and practices', Bennett resigned from his position. At the same time, Ronan was confirmed as the interim head coach and would remain in that position until at least the end of the season.

There was a brief uptick in the team's play during the transition but the team flagged in February, slipping down into the bottom third of the conference. Union managed to win its final two regular season games which pushed the team up to 7th and enabled the club to have a home date for the first round of the conference tournament.

The strong play that had suddenly appeared at the end continued into the postseason and Union was dominant in their two wins over Princeton. The team appeared to have turned a corner under Ronan and gave Clarkson everything they had. Against the second-seeded Golden Knights, Murphy was under a wither barrage of shots but he kept his team in both games, allowing the Dutchmen to tie the score on four separate occasions and push both matches into overtime. While the Dutchmen didn't have the firepower to win either contest, the team acquitted themselves well after a very trying campaign.

Departures

Recruiting

Roster
As of September 25, 2021.

|}

Standings

Schedule and results

|-
!colspan=12 style=";" | Exhibition

|-
!colspan=12 style=";" | Regular Season

|-
!colspan=12 style=";" | 

|- align="center" bgcolor="#e0e0e0"
|colspan=12|Union Won Series 2–0

|- align="center" bgcolor="#e0e0e0"
|colspan=12|Union Lost Series 0–2

Scoring statistics

Goaltending statistics

Rankings

Note: USCHO did not release a poll in week 24.

Awards and honors

References

2021–22
Union Dutchmen
Union Dutchmen
Union Dutchmen
Union Dutchmen